Simo is a Canadian short drama film, directed by Aziz Zoromba and released in 2022. The film stars Basel El Rayes and Seif El Rayes as Simo and Emad, two brothers whose competitive rivalry leads to a dangerous situation when Simo sneakily tries to take over Emad's online gaming channel.

The film premiered at the 2022 Toronto International Film Festival, where it was named the winner of the Best Canadian Short Film award.

The film was named to TIFF's annual year-end Canada's Top Ten list for 2022. It was shortlisted for the Prix collégial du cinéma québécois in 2023, and was a Canadian Screen Award nominee for Best Live Action Short Drama at the 11th Canadian Screen Awards in 2023.

References

External links

2022 films
2022 short films
Canadian drama short films
2020s Canadian films